Armina major is a species of sea slug, a nudibranch, a marine gastropod mollusk in the family Arminidae.

References

  MacDonald G. (2009) Nudibranch systematic index, 2nd online edition

Arminidae
Gastropods described in 1949